Sisters in Crime is an organization that has 4,500 members in 60+ regional chapters worldwide, offering networking, advice and support to mystery authors. Members are authors, readers, publishers, agents, booksellers and librarians bound by their affection for the mystery genre and their support of women who write mysteries.

Events leading up to the formation of Sisters in Crime included a conference at Hunter College on Women in the Mystery Genre in 1986, at which Sara Paretsky spoke on growing use of graphic sadism against women in mysteries; a letter by Phyllis Whitney to the Mystery Writers of America, pointing out that women were not being nominated for awards; an initial meeting of interested women at the October 1986 Bouchercon World Mystery Convention in Baltimore convened by Sara Paretsky; and a meeting at Sandra Scoppettone's loft during the annual Edgars week, at which the organization was formed.

The Sisters in Crime mission statement:
To combat discrimination against women in the mystery field, educate publishers and the general public as to inequities in the treatment of female authors, raise the level of awareness of their contributions to the field, and promote the professional advancement of women who write mysteries."

Presidents of the organization have included P. M. Carlson.

See also
Davitt Awards
List of female detective/mystery writers
List of female detective characters

References

External links
Sisters in Crime official site
Sisters in Crime San Diego, CA Chapter
Sisters in Crime Central Jersey, NJ Chapter
Sisters in Crime, Australia
Sisters in Crime New York

Feminist organizations in the United States
Mystery fiction
Organizations for women writers
Women's organizations based in the United States
American writers' organizations